The men's 100 metre breaststroke swimming competition at the 2002 Asian Games in Busan was held on 30 September at the Sajik Swimming Pool.

Schedule
All times are Korea Standard Time (UTC+09:00)

Records

Results 
Legend
DSQ — Disqualified

Heats

Final B

Final A

References 

2002 Asian Games Report, Pages 186–187
Results

Swimming at the 2002 Asian Games